Jabbar Threats (born April 26, 1975) is a former American football defensive end. He played for the Jacksonville Jaguars from 1997 to 1998.

References

1975 births
Living people
American football defensive ends
Michigan State Spartans football players
Jacksonville Jaguars players
Scottish Claymores players